Ferrite may refer to:

 Ferrite (iron), one of the allotropes of iron that is stable at room temperature and pressure, α-Fe
 Ferrite (magnet), a ferromagnetic ceramic material

See also
 
 Ferrite bead, a component placed on the end of a data cable to reduce interference
 Ferrite core, a structure on which the windings of electric transformers and other wound components are formed
 Barium ferrite (BaFe12O19), a ferrimagnetic ceramic material
 Bismuth ferrite, a promising multiferroic material
 Calcium aluminoferrite, a mineral found in cements